Petra Airlines was an airline based in Amman, Jordan. The company was founded in 2005 as a subsidiary of RUM Group (which also owned now defunct Air Rum), but acquired its first airplane only in October 2010. The name of the company was derived from the rock cut city of Petra, one of the most famous tourist sights in Jordan.

In early 2011, Petra Airlines began providing charter services to tour operators. In 2012, it upgraded its license to become a scheduled airline.

In January 2015, Air Arabia announced the acquisition of a 49% stake in Petra Airlines. The RUM Group retained a 51% stake in the airline, which was then rebranded as Air Arabia Jordan in early 2015. As such, it initially operates 2 Airbus A320 aircraft and there are plans to develop a new hub in Amman.

Destinations

Antalya – Antalya Airport
Bodrum – Milas–Bodrum Airport
Dalaman – Dalaman Airport

Jeddah – King Abdulaziz International Airport
Medina – Prince Mohammad Bin Abdulaziz Airport

Sharm El Sheikh – Sharm El Sheikh International Airport
Hurghada – Hurghada International Airport

Fleet

The Petra Airlines fleet consists of the following aircraft: (as of January 2015).

References

External links
Official website

Defunct airlines of Jordan
Airlines established in 2005
Airlines disestablished in 2014
Jordanian companies established in 2005